.ba is the Internet country code top-level domain (ccTLD) for Bosnia and Herzegovina. It is administered by the University Teleinformation Center.

Second-level domains
The procedure for registering domains within .ba is slightly more complicated than in other ccTLDs; the process is defined by laws and regulations of BiH institutions. For more information, please see Regulations regarding the registration of the BA domain. While international domains can be bought by anyone without any additional requests and documents, .BA domains can be registered by only entities that meet all requirements listed in the Regulations. While domain registration is free, a local presence is needed. Any company that has a registered name or registered trademark in Bosnia–Herzegovina can register an eponymous .BA domain (provided that the domain is not already taken), though some additional caveats apply.

Privately-owned second-level domains are permitted, which for-profit companies use. But there are also standardised second level domains:
.edu.ba for educational organisations
.gov.ba for governmental authorities
.net.ba for network operators
.org.ba for non profit organisations
.mil.ba is intended for military entities and affiliated organisations. As of December 2022, no domain names are registered under this second level domain.

The rules for the standardised second level domains are fairly well enforced.

References

External links
 IANA Delegation Record for .BA
 

Communications in Bosnia and Herzegovina
Country code top-level domains
Internet in Bosnia and Herzegovina
Council of European National Top Level Domain Registries members

sv:Toppdomän#B